Kismet is a compilation album by American neo soul/jazz artist Adriana Evans, released in April 2005 by Universal Records. The collection consists of hit songs from previous albums, alternate remixes as well as new songs.

The set features a remix of the popular single, "Remember the Love" from her album Nomadic and is also (the theme song for Logo's TV series, Noah's Arc.

Track listing

Credits
All tracks written by Adriana Evans and Jonathan "Dred" Scott.
Producer – Jonathan Dred Scott
Co-producer – Rastine Calhoun (tracks: 1, 7, 8)
Producer [Additional] – Adriana Evans (tracks: 1, 7, 8)

Personnel
Adriana Evans: All lead vocals, Background vocals
Producer: Jonathan 'Dred' Scott
Hakeem Williams: Piano 
Jay Frisco: Acoustic Guitar 
Sal Mendez: Bass Guitar 
Yohimba: Electric Guitar 
Darryl Crocks: Acoustic, Bass Guitar 
Joe Conrad: Electric Guitar 
Trevor Lawrence: Drums 
Greg Moore: Guitar 
Javier Espinosa: Guitar 
Michael Lazer: Mastered
Preston Boebel [Additional] Mixer
Vito Colapietro II [Additional] Mixer 
Charlie Beuter: Mixer

References

External links
 adrianaevans.com

2005 compilation albums
Adriana Evans albums
Albums produced by Dred Scott (musician)
Neo soul compilation albums
Contemporary R&B compilation albums
Funk compilation albums
Hip hop compilation albums